Chrétien Géofroy Nestler, name also given as Christian Gottfried Nestler (1 March 1778, Strasbourg – 2 October 1832), was an Alsatian botanist and pharmacist.

He studied under Louis Claude Richard in Paris, and in 1806–1810 served as a military pharmacist. He was later a professor of botany to the faculty of medicine at the University of Strasbourg and a chief pharmacist of Strasbourg hospices. In 1816 he was appointed director of the botanical garden at Strasbourg.

As a taxonomist, he described a number of species within the genus Potentilla. The genus Nestlera (family Asteraceae) was named in his honor by Kurt Sprengel.

Written works 
 "Monographia de Potentilla præmissis nonnullis observationibus circa familiam Rosacearum". (1816).
 "Index plantarum quae in horto Academ. Argentinensi anno 1817 viguerunt" (1818).
 Notice sur le Sedum repens (1830).
 "Index alphabeticus: generum, specierum et synonymorum", with Jean-Baptiste Mougeot and Wilhelm Philippe Schimper (1843).
 "Stirpes cryptogamæ vogeso-rhenanæ: quas in Rheni superioris inferiorisque, nec non Vogesorum præfecturis", with Jean-Baptiste Mougeot and Wilhelm-Philippe Schimper (1854).

References 

1778 births
1832 deaths
Academic staff of the University of Strasbourg
19th-century French botanists
French pharmacists
Alsatian people